Sully Creek State Park is a public recreation area located along the eastern banks of the Little Missouri River about  south of Medora in Billings County, North Dakota. The state park is used for camping, horse camping, and canoeing.

Activities and amenities
The park is the starting point for the Maah Daah Hey Trail which winds northwards to Theodore Roosevelt National Park and is used by horseback riders, mountain bikers, and hikers. The park offers camping, equestrian facilities, and canoe access to the Little Missouri River. It is open seasonally.

References

External links
Sully Creek State Park North Dakota Parks and Recreation Department
Sully Creek State Park Map North Dakota Parks and Recreation Department

State parks of North Dakota
Protected areas of Billings County, North Dakota
Protected areas established in 1970
Little Missouri River (North Dakota)